Lafferty Run is a  long first-order tributary to Kendall Creek.

Course

Watershed

See also 
 List of rivers of Pennsylvania

References

Rivers of Pennsylvania
Tributaries of the Allegheny River
Rivers of McKean County, Pennsylvania